Re a Company (No 001418 of 1988) [1990] BCC 526 is a UK insolvency law case, on the offence of fraudulent trading under s.213 of the Insolvency Act 1986.

Facts

The company had exceeded its overdraft limit and fallen behind in payments for PAYE, National Insurance contributions, VAT and debts to creditors (totalling around £212,618). Nevertheless Mr Barford, the company's director and majority shareholder, paid himself an increasingly high salary in the very years that debts were mounting to creditors.

Judgment
Judge Bromley Q.C. held that Mr Barford was guilty of fraudulent trading. He ordered £156,420 be contributed for the debts and liabilities, containing a compensatory element for the debts that were part of the fraudulent trading and a punitive element of £25,000 (following R v. Grantham [1984] QB 675). He held there was "real moral blame" in continuing the company's trading when there was no reason to think that the company could pay its debts as they fell due.

See also
R v. Grantham [1984] QB 675
Re Augustus Barnett & Son Ltd [1986] BCLC 170
Re Sarflax Ltd [1979] Ch 592

Notes

United Kingdom insolvency case law
1990 in case law
1990 in British law